Lizzie Kiama is a Kenyan activist. She is the managing trustee of This-Ability Trust, a Kenyan disability rights organization.

Early life and education 
Kiama is from Mombasa and was the first born of four children. She has a bachelor's degree in Business Administration from the United States International University.

At the age of 18, Kiama was injured in a car crash, which resulted in a physical disability. Complications while giving birth a few years later resulted in her disability becoming permanent.

Career 
Kiama founded This-Ability Trust, in 2012, to support companies with inclusion of people with disabilities and to teach women and girls skills, and to promote rights enshrined in the Convention on the Rights of Persons with Disabilities.

In 2018, as the director of gender and disability at This-Ability, she was one of several activists chosen to attend the 62nd session of the Commission for the Status of Women (CSW). In 2020, Kiama advocated for better access to sexual and reproductive health services for people with disabilities. In 2021, she was a contributor to a UNFPA report, "My body is my own: Claiming the right to autonomy and self-determination." In April 2021, with support from UNFPA, This-Ability helped create a toll-free and confidential phone number for women with disabilities seeking sexual and reproductive health services.

Kiama is an Ashoka fellow.

Family 
Kiama is married and has one daughter.

References 

Living people
People from Mombasa
United States International University alumni
Kenyan disability rights activists
Ashoka Canada Fellows
Kenyan women activists
Women activists
Year of birth missing (living people)